Chico DeBarge is the debut album by American singer Chico DeBarge. It was released by Motown Records in 1986 in the United States. The album peaked at number 90 on the US Billboard 200 and number 25 on the Top R&B/Hip-Hop Albums chart. Chico DeBarge spwaned the hit single "Talk to Me."

Critical reception

AllMusic editor Rick A. Bueche called Chico DeBarge his "best album for Motown" as well as "a fine start."

Track listing

Notes
 signifies co-producer(s)
 signifies associate producer(s)

Personnel

Chico DeBarge – vocals, keyboards (4, 8, 10), synthesizer (4, 8, 10)
Skip Drinkwater – drum computer programming (1)
Nick Mundy – guitar (1), synthesizer (1), drum computer programming (1), backing vocals (1)
Steve Dubin – bass synthesizer (1), drum computer programming (1, 7), percussion (7)
Paul Fox – synthesizer (1), drum computer programming (1), programming (4, 10)
Curtis Anthony Nolen – keyboards (2, 3), drum programming (2), backing vocals (2)
Jay Gruska – keyboards (3, 8 (overdubs), 9), drum programming (3, 9)
Paul Jackson Jr. – rhythm guitar (4)
Ralph Benatar – keyboards (5), soprano saxophone (5), Linn drums (5), programming (8)
Lorenzo Pryor – bass (5)
Larry Lingle – electric guitar (5)
Michael Dorian – keyboards (5)
Thomas Organ – guitar (6)
Gary Taylor – DMX synthesizer programming (6), backing vocals (6)
Dan Segal – synthesizer programming (6)
Kevin O'Neal – synthesizer (6)
Neil Stubenhause (sic) – bass (7)
Dann Huff – guitar (7)
Tommy Faragher – synthesizer (7)
Nathan East – bass (9)
Dee Dee Belson – backing vocals (1)
Maxie Anderson – backing vocals (1, 2, 3, 9)
Alfie Silas – backing vocals (2, 3, 9)
Phyllis St. James – backing vocals (2, 3, 9)
Darryl DeBarge – backing vocals (4)
James DeBarge – backing vocals (4, 5, 7)
David Paul Bryant – backing vocals (7)
DeBarge – backing vocals (8)

Charts

References 

1986 debut albums
Chico DeBarge albums
Motown albums
Dance-pop albums by American artists
Freestyle music albums